or  were the packets of cigarettes given out by the Japanese emperor. There were other kinds of special tobacco for relatives of the emperor and members of the Imperial Household. The production of the former came to an end in 1945. The production of Onshino Tabako finally ceased at the end of 2006, the last producer being the Japan Tobacco Company.

History
The exact origin of Onshino Tabako with the Imperial Seal of Japan, with the 16 petals of the chrysanthemum, is unknown; what is known is that Onshino Tabako had been in existence since the Meiji era. Empress Shōken, consort of the Emperor Meiji, presented wounded soldiers at the 1877 Satsuma Rebellion with Onshino Tabako as gifts, according to formal records. During the Sino-Japanese War (1894-1895), the cigarettes were produced by Iwaya Shokai Company.

Between 1883 and 1904, Yanagiya at Nipponbashi produced shredded tobacco and since 1894, cigarettes. In 1894, the Iwaya Shokai was given permission to produce the Onshino Tabako which were given out to soldiers 
participating in the Sino-Japanese War. In 1904, its production went to the Tobacco Monopoly Agency. The production line of Iwaya Shokai went to the Tokyo First Tobacco Production Place, and in the same year, Imperial tobacco began to be produced not only exclusively for noblemen, such as Emperor Taishō and his relatives, but also for its original purposes. Imperial tobacco was made from special leaves of tobacco, while the Special tobacco for noblemen and gifts was made from the finest Fuji leaf or 不二; these were also produced with the utmost care manually. Emperor Taishō was a smoker and smoked his exclusively produced cigarettes, while Emperor Shōwa did not; the production of Imperial tobacco, however, continued.

The formal Onshino Tabako system was started in 1933. During the war years it was included in the supplies of the army and navy, each order prepared by hand. The special cigarettes were even mentioned in a war song called "Sorano Yūshi" (Brave Men of the Skies) in 1939 which portrayed the Battles of Khalkhin Gol. On the packaging of Onshino Tabako was printed a character: 賜, meaning "gift from a noble man," and the chrysanthemum crest was on every cigarette. The taste of Onshino Tabako was reportedly the same as other cigarettes. According to some men who had tasted it, it was bitter, as opposed to sweet. It was not sold on the market, and was exclusively given to decorated persons, attendants at Imperial parties, visitors to and volunteers of Imperial House of Japan, and security men of the Imperial Household. The production of special tobacco for the relatives of the Emperor Shōwa was discontinued by the order of the General Headquarters of Japan of the allied forces in 1945. However, Onshino Tobako as gifts continued to be produced.

On June 25, 1959, it was presented to every member of the Tokyo Giants and Osaka Tigers, professional baseball teams which played before Emperor Shōwa. According to the records of the National Diet, it was the same as Asahi Cigarettes (30 yen per 20 cigarettes; in 2010, it was 20 yen.). There had been another kind of tobacco for the guests of the Imperial Household Agency and Imperial relatives, and it had the crest of chrysanthemum with 14 petals, as opposed to formal 16.

Because of recent health finds that confirm that tobacco smoking is dangerous to one's health, Onshino Tabako was discontinued at the end of 2006. In its place, Onshino Konpeitō, a candy, is often presented.

Terminology of Imperial Household-related tobacco 
The : tobacco for the Emperor, the Empress and the Empress Dowager. Its production started in 1873 by Sotoike Shozaburo (the name of the store was Yanagiya). The contract went to the Tobacco Monopoly Bureau in 1904, which started the production of tobacco for Emperor Meiji the same year and for the Empress in the fiscal 1906 year. At first, the leaves of tobacco were those stored in traditional houses since the Kanbun era (1661 - 1672) and other eras to Kansei era (1789 - 1800); since 1908, excellent tobacco producers and places had been selected, and the leaves were dried and stored at least for several years. The leaves were Kokubu (the name of place), Izumi, Tarumizu, Ibusuki, Maru, Mizufu, Taino and Kirigasa leaves. The last was used to soften the taste. All were excellent leaves in color, dryness and preparation.

Goryō tobacco had been produced with extreme supervision and with alcohol disinfection. The workers had been severely checked for health and behaviour. Goryō tobacco for Emperor Meiji were turned into cigarettes, one sun (1.195 in), 0.7 sun and 0.6 sun in lengths, with the chrysanthemum mark only in the one sun cigarettes. Twenty cigarettes were included in a pack; one paulownia box contained 100 cigarettes. Goryō tobacco for Emperor Taishō contained not only one sun-length cigarettes but also cigars (Turkey, Havana, and Turkey-Havana cigars: a box contained 25 cigars). Goryō cigars were produced for the Empress Meiji. In 1908, they were 2 sun and 4 bu (2.86 in) and 7 sun 5 rin (0.895 in) diameter. The Empress Shōken was a smoker but never smoked in front of the emperor.
 
The  Specially manufactured tobacco: There were two kinds of special tobacco; one for the Board of the Crown Prince and the empress and houses of princes (relatives of the emperor) and the other for gifts of the Imperial Household Agency. The houses of princes included the Houses of Princes Arisugawa, Kitashirakawa, Kayo, Kuni and others, and cigarettes were produced respectively for them. The production of special tobacco for the relatives of the emperor came to an end in 1945 on the order of the General Headquarters of the allied forces.

The quality of this tobacco was excellent, being of the level of Fuji (name of cigarettes), in fiscal 1918, the production of it with the quality of Asahi and in the fiscal 1920, the production of the level of Shikishima. Since 1914, the chrysanthemum mark had been printed in the center of cigarettes in order to prevent the mark from being stepped on. In the war years, the production of gift tobacco increased, reaching a peak of 28,656,000 cigarettes in the fiscal 1944 year. Asian with conventional leaves were used, and cigars were also produced which contained Havana leaves. Most of the cigarettes were the special cigarettes, 100 cigarettes to a box, while the cigarettes for the Household Agency came in packs of 100, 50, 20, ten and five cigarettes. Twenty-five cigars were included in a small box.

Package
When they were first produced, the characters "Onshi / 恩賜" were printed in gold on the package, and  it was formally called Special Product No. 1. When the war situation grew darker, gold characters were replaced with black one, and then trimmed to one character, 賜. This package remained as such during the postwar years.

In 1982, packages were made for ten, 20, 50, and 100 cigarettes. The tobacco for the Imperial Household Agency was called Special Tobacco No. 2 and contained the chrysanthemum crest on a white background. Since 1968, the 14 petal chrysanthemum package, Special Tobacco No. 3 was produced for the relatives of the emperor.

Factories and production
All Onshino Tabako were produced in several factories in the Tokyo Prefecture. Before 1945, no other persons were permitted to enter the production room, while workers were fastidiously checked for health. In 1973, six or seven veteran workers produced it, making all the tobacco and packaging it by hand.

During the Pacific War, the yearly production amounted to 1 to 2 million cigarettes, and between 1945 and 1965, less than 100,000 cigarettes. Since 1968, cigarettes with filter tips began to be produced, about 300,000 cigarettes yearly.

Onshino Cigars
Not only cigarettes, but also cigars were produced which had a decorated ring chrysanthemum crest, with 25 to each small wooden box. The leaves were produced in Sumatra and Havana. The production of cigars started in 1939, while the exclusive cigars for Emperor Taishō started earlier in 1917. In 1945, 4,000 cigars were produced. This was peak production. Between 1945 and 1982, an average of 2,500 cigars were produced.

In culture
It is said that the novelist Yukio Mishima smoked Onshino Tabako before committing harakiri in 1970.
Yoshio Yoshida, a Hanshin Tigers baseball player treasured his Onshino Tabako for more than 50 years.

References

Further reading
Toshiya Matsuzaki, The Fundamental Knowledge of Tenno, Rekishijin, No. 3. KK Best Sellers, December 2010
Nariko Matsumoto, I Need No Onshin Tabako, Fujin Shimpo, 1993-4, p. 22
Tobacco Study Center, The encyclopedia of Tobacco San-ai Shoin, 2009, 724-725
Japan Tobacco Tokyo Factory History editing committee, 70 more years with tobacco Japan Tobacco Tokyo Factory, 1982
Japan Monopoly Corporation, The History of the Tobacco Monopoly Vol. 1, 1964

External links 

Cigarette brands
Japanese Imperial Warrant holders
Tobacco in Japan